Austrocortirubin is an antibacterial metabolite found in the Dermocybe splendida mushroom.

Notes 

Antimicrobials
Natural phenols
Tetrahydroxyanthraquinones
Ethers
3-Hydroxypropenals within hydroxyquinones